Green Velvet is a compilation album by Green Velvet. It was released on F-111 Records in 2000.

Critical reception

Andy Kellman of AllMusic stated that "the compilation is an endless barrage of slick spots, surely enough to entertain and convert and definitely a concise way to please the already informed." M. Tye Comer of CMJ New Music Report wrote, "In his deep, monotone drawl, Velvet (the alter ego of Chicago house producer Curtis A. Jones, a.k.a. Cajmere) humorously muses about his life's many miseries over tough drum beats and sparse, yet gritty '80s synthesizers." Michael Paoletta of Billboard described it as "A quirky mix of trance, techno, electro, and house". The song Percolator, Flash, and many other songs by Cajmere (AKA Green Velvet) were recorded, engineered and mixed by Jerome Mikulich of the Playroom Recording Studio, which was located in Chicago Heights, IL and was relocated in 1994 to downtown Chicago IL on 520 N. Michigan Ave.

Track listing

References

External links
 

2000 compilation albums
Green Velvet albums